Joseph McGhie (22 March 1884 – 8 September 1976) was a Scottish professional footballer who played as a centre-half for Football League clubs Sunderland and Sheffield United in the  and for Brighton & Hove Albion of the Southern League. He was a member of the Albion team that won the 1910 FA Charity Shield.

References

1884 births
1976 deaths
People from Kilbirnie
Scottish footballers
Association football defenders
Sunderland A.F.C. players
Sheffield United F.C. players
Brighton & Hove Albion F.C. players
Stalybridge Celtic F.C. players
English Football League players
Southern Football League players